Luchakali (English: Hide and seek) is an Odia drama and thriller film released on 30 March 2012.  it features Babushaan, Shriya Jha, Samaresh Routray and Ajit Das in key roles with original music by Anbu Selvam. It is partially inspired by Hollywood thriller Sleeping with the Enemy.

Synopsis
Tanmay Mohanty (Babushan) is a sculpturist and deadly love with Monalisa Das (Sherya Jha). Tanmay is an orphan and Monalisa takes care of everything in the life of Tanmay. Oneday Monalisa's father become blind in an accident. To manage the poor financial condition of the family, Monalisa's step-mother agrees to the marriage proposal by one Kalidas Patnaik (Samaresh Routray) with Monalisa with a consideration of heavy amount offered by Kalidas. Kalidas ia poet and has obsessive-compulsive personality disorder symptoms. After Kalidas's marriage with Monalisa, he tries to torture her a lot. While they are traveling in a boat, Monalisa escapes by jumping into water.

Kalidas tries to search Monalisa everywhere but can't find her. in the meanwhile Tanmay rescue Monalisa from water and keeps her in a secret place. Meanwhile, he tries to take revenge upon Kalidas. When Kalidas with the help of Police Inspector Mohan (Bijay Mohanty) traces their whereabouts, Tanmay and Monalisa escapes from the scene. At last when Kalidas tries to kill Monalisa, Tanmay reaches the scene, saves Monalisa by killing Kalidas.

Cast
Babushaan as Tanmay Mohanty
Shriya Jha as Monalisa Das
Samaresh Routray as Kalidas Patnaik
Bijay Mohanty as Mohan Das
Ajit Das as Mona's father
Bikash Das as Nira Kakei
Shweta Acharya as Monalisa's step mother
Ankita Bhowmick as Priya
Megha Ghosh as Item song dancer

filming
The film is shot at various locations of Bhubaneswar, Cuttack and Dhenkanal.

Review
The film generally received positive reviews from critics especially for Samaresh Routray.  FullOrissa gave it 3 out of 5 and commented "It seems like Samaresh has shared this script with Susant Mani only for winning an award in the next upcoming celebrity award shows. Susant Mani as usual have done a great job in Luchakali. The movie is technically well driven, The Thrillers in this movie are one of its type in Oriya Movie Industry. ".
Odisha Today mentioned " Director Susant Mani, who is also written the script, made few experiment in the plot to give a different taste, a suspense thriller." The New Indian Express quoted "The movie has a lot of special effects to keep the thrill quotient up. Even as the movie scores high on technical aspects, there are some loose ends to the music. Compared to Sushant’s previous hit Chocolate, the music in Luchakali is slow. The film’s music has been scored by Anbu Selvan who happens to be the guitarist of A R Rahman. Goodly Rath’s soulful musical touch in Sushant’s Chocolate is missing this time."

Soundtrack
The Music for the film is composed by Anbu Selvam

Box office
The film did not well in the box office and was declared a disaster.

Awards
 4th Tarang Cine Awards 2013
 Best Actor in negative role-Samaresh Routray
 Best Actress in negative role-Shweta Acharya
 Best Cinematographer - Abhiram Mishra 
 Etv Oriya Film Awards 2013
 Best Oriya Film (Nominated)
 Best Director(Nominated)- Sushant Mani
 Best Actor in negative role(Nominated)-Samaresh Routray

References

External links
 

2012 films
Films about domestic violence
2010s Odia-language films
Indian remakes of American films
Films directed by Susant Mani